A Century Ends is the debut studio album by musician David Gray, released on 12 April 1993. Following the success of Gray's fourth album White Ladder, which sparked an interest in his back catalogue, A Century Ends was re-released in July 2001. Three singles were released from the album: "Birds Without Wings," "Shine" and "Wisdom."

Critical reception
Trouser Press wrote that "Gray sings with equal parts sensitivity and vitality, emotional attributes that underscore the Van Morrison qualities of his tenor ... Excellent."

Track listing

Credits

Musicians 
 David Gray – vocals, guitar
 Neil MacColl – guitar, mandolin, backing vocals
 Dave Anderson – piano, Wurlitzer electric piano, organ
 Mark Smith – bass
 Steve Sidelnyk – drums, percussion
 Mike Smith – saxophone

Production 
 Produced by Dave Anderson
 Recorded by Jim Abbiss
 Mixed by Dave Anderson
 Photography by Robin Lewis Grierson

References 

David Gray (musician) albums
1993 debut albums
Virgin Records albums